Nicatous Lake is a body of water in Hancock County, Maine. Covering , it is the second largest lake in Hancock County and one of the largest in the state of Maine. It is also a very shallow lake with low oxygen. The principal fisheries include landlocked salmon, brown trout, smallmouth bass, white perch and chain pickerel.

In 1999, the State of Maine purchased 78 undeveloped islands in Nicatous Lake as part of a conservation program.

See also
 List of lakes in Maine

References

Lakes of Hancock County, Maine
Reservoirs in Maine